The United States Post Office-Scottsbluff is a historic building in Scottsbluff, Nebraska. It was built by Bernard R. Desjardins in 1930, and designed in the Renaissance Revival style by architect James A. Wetmore. Its construction was jeopardized by the Great Depression, and initial plans for a larger building were scrapped. It has been listed on the National Register of Historic Places since October 5, 1989.

References

External links

National Register of Historic Places in Scotts Bluff County, Nebraska
Renaissance Revival architecture in Nebraska
Government buildings completed in 1930
Post office buildings on the National Register of Historic Places in Nebraska